"Little by Little" is a rock song performed by the English rock singer Robert Plant, from his 1985 album Shaken 'n' Stirred. It was released as a single and entered the Billboard Top 40 on June 15, 1985, peaking at number 36. It was Plant's third Top 40 single as a solo artist.

"Little by Little" was also a number-one hit on the Billboard Mainstream Rock chart, staying at the top position for two weeks. It was Plant's second solo song to top that chart, after "Other Arms" from the 1983 album The Principle of Moments. It charted on the UK singles chart as well, peaking at number 83.

"Little by Little" was written by Plant and the keyboardist Jezz Woodroffe. The song was featured on the Miami Vice episode "Junk Love".

References 

1985 singles
Robert Plant songs
Songs written by Robert Plant
1985 songs